Sarvis Branch is a stream in Benton County in the U.S. state of Missouri.

The creek most likely was named after the sarvisberry along its course.

See also
List of rivers of Missouri

References

Rivers of Benton County, Missouri
Rivers of Missouri